Alex Wootton (born 7 July 1994) is an Irish rugby union player for Connacht in the United Rugby Championship and European Rugby Champions Cup. He plays primarily as a wing, but can also play as a fullback, and represents Garryowen in the All-Ireland League.

Early life
Wootton was born in Prestbury, England, though he qualifies for Ireland through his father, who is from County Down, Northern Ireland. He began playing rugby aged 7 and moved to Sedbergh School aged 12. Wootton joined the Northampton Saints academy ahead of the 2012–13 season.

Professional career

Munster
By the summer of 2013, Wootton had moved to Munster and joined their academy.
Wootton made his competitive debut for Munster on 24 September 2016, when he came on as a substitute against Edinburgh in a 2016–17 Pro12 fixture. Wootton made his first start for Munster on 1 October 2016 in the Pro12 fixture against Zebre. On 26 November 2016, Wootton scored his first try for Munster in the sides 46–3 win against Benetton at Thomond Park. On 16 March 2017, it was announced that Wootton had signed a two-year contract extension with Munster. In the final of the 2016–17 British and Irish Cup, which was held in Irish Independent Park, Cork on 21 April 2017, Wootton scored a sensational solo try and helped Munster A defeat their English RFU Championship opponents Jersey Reds 29–28 to claim their second title in the tournament.

Wootton scored four tries in Munster's 2017–18 Pro14 fixture against South African side Cheetahs on 9 September 2017, helping the province to a 51–18 win in Thomond Park and earning the Man-of-the-Match award for his performance. In doing so, Wootton equalled the United Rugby Championship record for most tries scored in a single game. He scored two tries in Munster's 36–19 win against Zebre on 26 November 2017. Wootton made his European Rugby Champions Cup debut on 9 December 2017, starting in the Pool 4 fixture against Leicester Tigers in Thomond Park. In his first appearance of the 2018–19 season on 29 September 2018, Wootton scored a try in Munster's 64–7 win against Ulster in round 5 of the 2018–19 Pro14. He signed a two-year contract extension with Munster in December 2018 for the 2019–2021 seasons.

Connacht
Wootton joined Connacht on loan for the 2020–21 season, and made his debut for the province in their 26–20 win against Ulster on 23 August 2020. Wootton joined Connacht on a permanent basis from the 2021–22 season. Following a strong season in the Championship in which he was joint top try-scorer with 9 tries, Wootton was named to the 2020–21 Pro14 Dream Team.

On 6th March 2023 Connacht Rugby announced Wotton intended to retire from Professional Rugby at season 2022/23 end, to pursue other options.

Ireland
Wooton played for the Ireland national rugby sevens team during the 2016 Men's Rugby Sevens Final Olympic Qualification Tournament. Ireland finished first in their group with three wins, including a 27–21 win over World Series core team Samoa. However, Ireland lost 12–7 in their quarter-final against Spain and failed to qualify for the Olympics.

References

External links
Connacht Profile
Munster Profile
Pro14 Profile

U20 Six Nations Profile

Living people
1994 births
Irish rugby union players
Garryowen Football Club players
Munster Rugby players
Connacht Rugby players
Ireland international rugby sevens players
Rugby union wings
Rugby union fullbacks